Rock 'n' Rave is the second studio album by Italian DJ and record producer Benny Benassi. It was released on 3 June 2008, through Ultra Music.  The album sees a change in Benassi's sound from that he used from 2003's Hypnotica until 2005's ...Phobia.  It would also see Benassi featuring a more diverse pool of vocalists than the ones him and Al Benassi used on previous albums, with Sannie Carlson being the only returning vocalist.

Track listing

References

External links

2008 albums
Benny Benassi albums